KMHL (1400 AM) is a radio station broadcasting a full service News/Talk/Classic Country format serving Marshall, Minnesota. Since its inception, the station has been owned by Linder Radio Group. The station first signed on the air on November 30, 1946. KMHL also rebroadcasts on FM translator K269GR 101.7 FM in Marshall.

Translators
KMHL broadcasts on the following FM translator:

References

External links
1400 KMHL official website
Marshall Radio website

Radio stations in Minnesota
News and talk radio stations in the United States
Radio stations established in 1946
1946 establishments in Minnesota